"Point of Light" is a song written by Don Schlitz and Thom Schuyler, and recorded by American country music artist Randy Travis.  It was released in May 1991 as the lead-off single from his album High Lonesome.  It was his twenty-first single overall.  It charted at #3 on the Billboard Hot Country Singles & Tracks and hit #1 on the Canadian RPM country Tracks chart.

Content
This song has a moral message to do the right thing and become a "point of light". The song goes on to praise social workers and teachers as points of light. Don Schlitz and Thom Schuyler were commissioned to write the song in response to then-United States President George H. W. Bush's "Thousand points of light" program.

Musicians
As listed in liner notes.
Dennis Burnside - piano
Larry Byrom - acoustic guitar
Mark Casstevens - acoustic guitar
Steve Gibson - electric guitar
Doyle Grisham - steel guitar
David Hungate - bass guitar
Larrie Londin - drums
Terry McMillan - percussion, harmonica
Mark O'Connor - fiddle
Randy Travis - lead vocals
John Willis - electric guitar

Background vocals
Carol Chase
Cindy Richardson-Walker
John Wesley Ryles
Lisa Silver
Dennis Wilson
Curtis Young

Chart performance
"Point of Light" spent two weeks at number 1 on the Canadian RPM Country Tracks chart.

Year-end charts

References

1991 singles
Randy Travis songs
Songs written by Don Schlitz
Songs written by Thom Schuyler
Song recordings produced by Kyle Lehning
Warner Records singles
1991 songs